The Chörblispitz (2,103 m) is a mountain of the Swiss Prealps, located north of Jaun in the canton of Fribourg. It lies on the range between the valley of the Breccaschlund and the valley of the Jaunbach.

References

External links
Chörblispitz on Hikr.org

Mountains of the Alps
Mountains of Switzerland
Mountains of the canton of Fribourg
Two-thousanders of Switzerland